Spytkowice  is a village in Nowy Targ County, Lesser Poland Voivodeship, in southern Poland. It is the seat of the gmina (administrative district) called Gmina Spytkowice.

The village has a population of approximately 4,000.

References

Spytkowice